Kivach may refer to:
Kivach waterfall, a waterfall on the Suna River in Republic of Karelia
Kivach Nature Reserve, a natural reserve in Republic of Karelia including the Kivach waterfall.